Victor Turner was the seventh head football coach at Tuskegee University in Tuskegee, Alabama and he held that position for the 1922 season.  His coaching record at Tuskegee was 1–5–1.

References

Year of birth missing
Year of death missing
Tuskegee Golden Tigers football coaches